Duck Pimples is a 1945  animated whodunit short film produced by Walt Disney Productions and released by RKO Radio Pictures. The cartoon parodies radio crime stories and film noir dramas.

Plot
Donald Duck's imagination, enhanced by scary stories on the radio and in books, moves him into a seemingly real crime world, which ultimately turns out to be imaginary. Donald's dream is enhanced by the backgrounds that abruptly change each time a new character appears in it.

Scenes where Donald is threatened with a knife and the detective is threatened with an axe were at one time cut, but have been restored for the VHS Release and DVD release.

The cartoon is perhaps the closest Disney ever got to the fast-paced and surreal nature that reminiscent of Tex Avery, and specifically references his Who Killed Who? (1943) in two ways: the use of an organ instead of a traditional orchestral score, and having Billy Bletcher voice the detective.

Voice cast

 Donald Duck: Clarence Nash
 Radio actor/Salesman/Dopey Davis/J. Harold King/Donald's conscience: Jack Mather
 Pauline: Mary Lenihan
 Radio host: Doodles Weaver
 Leslie J. Clark: Harry E. Lang
 Radio actor/H. U. Hennessy: Billy Bletcher

Home media
The short was released on December 6, 2005, on Walt Disney Treasures: The Chronological Donald, Volume Two: 1942-1946.

Reception
Cartoon Brew called Duck Pimples "the creepiest Disney short ever made" and its animation a "top-drawer work".

References

1945 films
1945 animated films
1940s crime films
1940s Disney animated short films
Donald Duck short films
American crime films
Films about dreams
Films directed by Jack Kinney
Films produced by Walt Disney
American parody films
Films scored by Oliver Wallace
Film noir cartoons